The Battery refers to:

Places
The Battery (Charleston), South Carolina, United States
The Battery (Manhattan) in New York City
The Battery, St. John's, Newfoundland, Canada
The Battery Atlanta, a development in Atlanta, Georgia, United States

Other uses

The Battery (2007 film), Japanese film
The Battery (2012 film), American film
Patarei Prison, or The Battery, a building complex in Tallinn, Estonia

See also
Battery (disambiguation)